Keaton Henson (born 24 March 1988) is an English musician, composer, visual artist, and poet.
Henson has released six studio albums, a wordless graphic novel called Gloaming, published by Pocko, and a book of poetry called Idiot Verse. Henson suffers from anxiety and, as a result, rarely plays concerts.

History

Early life and career beginnings (1988–2012)

Keaton Henson was born in 1988 in London, England. He is the son of actor Nicky Henson and ballet dancer Marguerite Porter, and the half-brother of composer Christian Henson.

Henson began his career as an illustrator. He designed the artwork for various albums including Dananananaykroyd's Hey Everyone! and Enter Shikari's Take to the Skies. Henson recorded songs in his apartment in London, initially purely for his own consumption. He gave a recording of one of the songs as a gift to his best friend, and was encouraged to put music online. In November 2010 his debut album Dear... was released on Motive Sounds Recordings, in a self-made limited edition. In 2011 he released a single, "Metaphors", on Porchlight Records. He also recorded "Don't Be Afraid" for the Tormented soundtrack.

Henson's musical breakthrough came when Zane Lowe played "You Don't Know How Lucky You Are" on BBC Radio 1 for the first time on 7 September 2011, saying: "That piece of music right there ... is one of the most special pieces of music I've heard in a very very long time". Lowe said that the reaction from listeners had been 'brilliant'.

Henson formed his own record company, Oak Ten Records, and officially re-released his debut album Dear... in 2012. The album was critically acclaimed: the BBC reported "Keaton Henson isn't a show-off, but with talent like this, he has every right to be". On Metacritic the album received a score of 70 out of 100. Dear... didn't enter the charts but from it three singles were released– "Charon", "Small Hands" and "You Don't Know How Lucky You Are" – all of which were accompanied by music videos. The video for "Charon" was shortlisted for a UK MVA award in Best Budget Indie/Rock Category. "Small Hands" won Best Music Video at the Rushes Soho Shorts Film Festival in 2012.

In July 2012 Henson released The Lucky EP. In November 2012, Henson designed a t-shirt for the Yellow Bird Project to raise money for the Teenage Cancer Trust.

Birthdays and further projects (2013–2020)

Henson wrote and recorded his second album, Birthdays, in less than a year. He travelled to California to record the album and worked with American producer Joe Chiccarelli. and it was released in February 2013. The BBC said of the album: "Up there, warmed by the fire, he's cloistered away from Twitter and all the other evils of this parish. There's no better way to shut out the din than by putting this record on". A limited edition version of the album was released featuring three bonus songs and a hand-painted piece of art taken from a large painting by Henson which had been cut into 196 pieces. Birthdays spawned three singles: "Lying to You", "Sweetheart, What Have You Done To Us", and "You" (released as a limited edition 7" single for Record Store Day with an etching by Henson on the b-side). The album was also released as a limited book edition, featuring illustrations made by different artists accompanying the songs.

In 2012 and 2013, Henson performed sporadically, usually in small venues, galleries or museums. His art show "Hithermost" took place at the Pertwee, Anderson & Gold gallery in London in January 2013 and "sold quickly". In August 2013 NPR Music published a live Tiny Desk Concert on their website and on YouTube. The songs performed included "You Don't Know How Lucky You Are", "Sweetheart What Have You Done to Us" and "You". In late 2013 Henson performed in three churches around England.

On 16 June 2014 Henson performed at the Queen Elizabeth Hall in London as part of the James Lavelle-curated Meltdown festival. On the day of the concert, Henson released an unannounced new album, Romantic Works, featuring cellist Ren Ford. It was initially streamed exclusively on The Guardian website and later on Spotify.

In early 2015 Henson composed a score for Young Men, a dance project from BalletBoyz which was performed at the Sadler's Wells Theatre in London as a co-production with 14-18 NOW. Henson's first three albums were re-pressed on vinyl with bonus tracks in June 2015.

In October 2015 Henson released an album as part a side project, under the pseudonym Behaving. The album was more electronic sounding than his previous releases and was first streamed on Soundcloud and iTunes. The same month also saw the release of Henson's debut poetry collection, Idiot Verse.

In September 2016 Henson released his latest studio album, Kindly Now. In July 2018 his Six Lethargies for string orchestra was premiered at the Barbican Centre by Britten Sinfonia. The 70-minute work was jointly commissioned by the Barbican, Vivid Sydney and National Concert Hall, Dublin. It was also performed at the Sydney Opera House, and was subsequently released as an LP in 2019.

Monument (2020-present)

In May 2020, Henson released his single "Career Day", which was his first release featuring vocals since "Epilogue". A follow-up single to 2016's Kindly Now, it was followed by another single, "Ontario", in June. On 23 October 2020, Henson released his latest record Monument. The album features Philip Selway of Radiohead on drums and percussion. The album deals with his father, Nicky Henson, and his battle with a terminal illness. The album was completed two days before his father's death. A follow up EP to 'Monument', 'Fragments' was released on 27th August 2021. Recorded at the same time as "Monument", it features 8 tracks, including a collaboration with Julien Baker, "Marionette", and the singles "Before Growing Old", "Limb", and "No Love Lost."

Henson also provided the music for the 2020 film Supernova directed by Harry Macqueen. The soundtrack was released by Lakeshore Records on 29 January 2021.

Collaborations

Henson has appeared on The Flight's EP Hangman, The Staves EP Mexico and with the London electronic group Unkle on several tracks including "Farewell", "Sonata" and "Sick Lullaby" from The Road: Part 1 and "The First Time I Ever Saw Your Face" from The Road: Part II (Lost Highway).

In popular culture

Henson's music has featured in the BBC Three zombie drama In the Flesh (2013-2014), Derek, Elementary, The Blacklist and in the 2014 film X+Y (known as A Brilliant Young Mind in the US). An excerpt from his poetry was quoted in the first episode of STARZ television series “The Gloaming". His song "Teach Me" was played in the hit TV show "Greys Anatomy" in Season 9 Episode 19.

Discography

Concerts & Tours

References

External links

 Official Youtube channel, including music videos

English folk musicians
English composers
English illustrators
1988 births
Living people
Mercury KX artists